Pulchellodromus punctiger is a spider species found in the Canary Islands and Spain.

See also 
 List of Philodromidae species

References

External links 

Philodromidae
Spiders of the Canary Islands
Spiders of Europe
Spiders described in 1908